Sergey Vadimovich Abisov (born 27 November 1967, Simferopol) is the former minister of Ministry of Internal Affairs for the Republic of Crimea, and a police colonel.

Biography
He was born on November 27, 1967 in Simferopol. From 1986 to 1988, he served in the Armed Forces of the USSR. He started his work for the Soviet Ministry of Interior as a police officer, the commander of a separate battalion of militia responsible for the  private security (vnevedomstvennaya okhrana) in 1988. Since February 1998, he has been part of the Criminal Investigation Department of the Main Control Ministry of Interior of Ukraine in Crimea. On 1 March 2014, Abisov became the Acting Chief of the Interior Ministry of Ukraine in the Autonomous Republic of Crimea. Just nearly a month later, however, he became the acting Minister of Internal Affairs of the Republic of Crimea. By a decree from Vladimir Putin on May 6, 2014, Abisov was appointed as Minister of Internal Affairs of the Republic of Crimea.

Abisov has been dismissed from the Ministry of Internal Affairs of Ukraine for "high treason", and the Ukrainian authorities announced their desire to arrest Abisov. He is suspected of committing crimes under Part 1 of Article 109 of the Criminal Code of Ukraine ("actions aimed at violent change or overthrow of the constitutional order or the seizure of state power").

Abisov is included on the list of people sanctioned by the United States, Canada, European Union, Norway, Switzerland, and other countries. On 4 June 2018, he was dismissed from office. He was replaced by Oleg Torubarov.

Notes

References

1967 births
Fugitives wanted by Ukraine
Living people
Politicians from Simferopol
People of the annexation of Crimea by the Russian Federation
Ukrainian politicians
Russian politicians
Russian individuals subject to European Union sanctions